The 1901 Illinois Fighting Illini football team was an American football team that represented the University of Illinois during the 1901 Western Conference football season.  In its first season under head coach Edgar Holt, the team compiled an 8–2 record, finished in fourth place in the Western Conference, and outscored opponents by a total of 243 to 39.

Tackle Justa Lindgren was the team captain. Two Illinois players received honors on the 1901 All-Western college football team:
 Guard Jake Stahl - first-team honors from the Chicago American, Chicago Daily News, Chicago Record-Herald, and Chicago Tribune
 Center Fred Lowenthal - first-team honors from the Chicago American, Chicago Tribune, and Walter Camp.

Schedule

Roster

References

Illinois
Illinois Fighting Illini football seasons
Illinois Fighting Illini football